The 1967 FIBA World Championship was the 5th FIBA World Championship, the international basketball world championship for men's teams. It was hosted by Montevideo, Uruguay from 27 May to 11 June 1967.

Venues

Competing nations

Competition format
 Preliminary round: Three groups of four teams play each other once; top two teams progress to the final round, bottom two teams relegated to classification round.
 Classification round: All bottom two teams from preliminary round group play each other once. The team with the best record is ranked eighth; the worst is ranked 13th.
 Final round: All top two teams from preliminary round group, the 1964 Olympic champion, and the host team play each other once. The team with the best record wins the championship.

Preliminary round

Group A

Group B

Group C

Classification round

Final round

Awards

Final rankings

All-Tournament Team

 Radivoj Korać (Yugoslavia)
 Ivo Daneu (Yugoslavia)
 Mieczyslaw Lopatka (Poland)
 Modestas Paulauskas (USSR)
 Luiz Cláudio Menon (Brazil)

Top scorers (ppg)

 Mieczyslaw Lopatka (Poland) 19.7
 Bohdan Likszo (Poland) 19.3
 Luiz Cláudio Menon (Brazil) 18.6
 Ernesto Ghermann (Argentina) 18.3
 Gianfranco Lombardi (Italy) 17.5
 Ubiratan Pereira Maciel (Brazil) 15.9
 Manuel Raga (Mexico) 15.6
 Radivoj Korać (Yugoslavia) 14.6
 Arturo Guerrero (Mexico) 14.4
 Ivo Daneu (Yugoslavia) 14.0

References

External links
 
 

FIBA Basketball World Cup
B
World Championship
1967 in Uruguayan sport